Paul Islands is a group of islands  in extent, lying northwest of Quinton Point off the northwest coast of Anvers Island, in the Palmer Archipelago. Discovered and named by the German expedition under Dallmann, 1873–74.

See also 
 List of Antarctic and sub-Antarctic islands

References 

Islands of the Palmer Archipelago